The Indian Missionary Society is a Catholic Religious Congregation. It is located in Varanasi, Uttar Pradesh, India.

History 
It was founded on 3 November 1941 by Fr. Gaspar A Pinto. 

Fr. Gaspar stayed in a rented house in Maldahiya, Varanasi, when he arrived India. In 1943 he bought a plot of land outside the city and named it Christnagar. He laid the foundation of the Mother House of the IMS in Christnagar. Bishop Angelo Poli of Allahabad canonically erected it as a Society of Indigenous Priests on 13 March 1945.  In 1953 Msgr. Jos A. E. Fernandez was appointed first Superior General of the society. The Generalate (head office) of the IMS is in Varanasi. It is spread in almost 5 regions

Present 
The Congregation is spread in 5 regions and undertakes preaching and missionary work in the rural areas of India. Society at present has 218 religious priests who take care of 65 parishes.

List of Superiors

References 

Catholic Church in India
1941 establishments in India